The Duller Olive is a collection of poems by Peter Russell. The subtitle of the volume is 'Early poems uncollected or previously unpublished 1942 - 1959.' It was published by the University of Salzburg in 1993

British poetry collections
1993 poetry books